= Nguyễn Công Trứ High School =

School in Ho Chi Minh City, Vietnam

Coordinates: 10.8391°N 106.6527°E

Nguyen Cong Tru High School is a high school in Ho Chi Minh City, Vietnam. It is named after the Vietnamese general Nguyễn Công Trứ.

== History ==
In 1986, "Throng Tay Hai" school was opened and later changed to "Nguyen Cong Tru Senior High School" in 1992. It was rebuilt with modern facilities in two periods of time, 1999–2001 and 2001–2005.

== Curriculum ==
Classes for majors in Science subjects: Math, Physics, Chemistry, and Biology. Students are oriented towards 2 sections in preparation for entrance examinations to universities: Section A (Math, Physics, Chemistry) and Section B (Math, Chemistry, Biology).

Classes for majors in Social Subjects: Math, Literature, English, History and Geography. Students are oriented towards two sections in preparation for entrance examinations to universities: Section C (Literature, History, Geography); Section D (Math, Literature, foreign languages).

== Facilities ==
Located at 97 Quang Trung- ward 8th- Go Vap District- Ho Chi Minh City, Nguyen Cong Tru High School spans over an area of 6,552 m^{2}, with the following facilities:

- 69 classrooms
- 2 laboratories for Physics, Chemistry
- 3 Informatics rooms with over 65 computers
- 2 multimedia rooms and 1 modern Lab (used for learning English)
- 1 Auditorium

== Principals ==
- 1986-1998: Nguyen Viết Ngan
- 1999-now: Vinh Minh Hoax
